Loïc Damour (born 8 January 1991) is a French professional footballer who plays as a midfielder for  club Versailles.

A graduate of the world-renowned Clairefontaine academy, Damour has played for a number of clubs during his career, including Strasbourg, Boulogne, Brussels, White Star Bruxelles, Fréjus Saint-Raphaël, Bourg-en-Bresse Péronnas, and Cardiff City.

Club career

Early years 
Loïc began his career with his local club US Chantilly before moving to the famous Clairefontaine academy in 2004. While training at Clairefontaine, he also attended the prestigious sports club Athletic Club de Boulogne Billencourt, which also trained current French stars Hatem Ben Arfa and Issiar Dia.

RC Strasbourg 
In April 2008 after leaving Clairefontaine, Damour signed his first professional contract, agreeing to a three-year deal with RC Strasbourg. After spending one year in the reserves, he was promoted to the senior squad and was assigned the number 26 shirt. He made his professional football debut for Strasbourg on 4 August 2008 in a Ligue 2 match against Montpellier coming on as a substitute.

On 26 October 2009, Damour signed a contract extension with Strasbourg until the year 2013.

Cardiff City 
On 6 July 2017, following the expiry of his contract with Bourge-Péronnas, Damour signed for EFL Championship side Cardiff City on a free transfer. He made his debut for the club on the opening day of the 2017–18 season during a 1–0 victory over Burton Albion, as a substitute in place of Lee Tomlin.

Heart of Midlothian 
Damour left Cardiff in August 2019 and signed a four-year contract with Scottish Premiership club Hearts.

Le Mans (loan) 
On 3 August 2021, Damour joined Championnat National side Le Mans on a season-long loan.

Versailles
In June 2022, Damour signed with Versailles in Championnat National.

International career
Damour is a France youth international having played for the U-16s, U-17s, and the under-18 team. He also played with the France U-19 and France U-20 squads, until 2011. He was captain of the U-16 squad and was a part of the U-17 squad that finished runners-up at the 2008 UEFA European Under-17 Championship.

Career statistics

Honours
Cardiff City
EFL Championship runner-up: 2017–18

References

External links
 
 
Profile on RC Strasbourg Website
LFP Profile

1991 births
Living people
People from Chantilly, Oise
Sportspeople from Oise
French footballers
France youth international footballers
Association football midfielders
INF Clairefontaine players
RC Strasbourg Alsace players
US Boulogne players
R.W.D.M. Brussels F.C. players
RWS Bruxelles players
ÉFC Fréjus Saint-Raphaël players
Football Bourg-en-Bresse Péronnas 01 players
Cardiff City F.C. players
Heart of Midlothian F.C. players
Le Mans FC players
FC Versailles 78 players
Ligue 2 players
Championnat National players
Challenger Pro League players
English Football League players
Premier League players
Scottish Professional Football League players
French expatriate footballers
Expatriate footballers in Belgium
Expatriate footballers in Scotland
Expatriate footballers in Wales
French expatriate sportspeople in Belgium
French expatriate sportspeople in Scotland
French expatriate sportspeople in Wales
Footballers from Hauts-de-France